Stary Kainlyk (İśke Qayınlıq) is a village located in Novokainlykovsky Selsoviet, Krasnokamsky District, Bashkortostan, Russia. The population was 128 as of 2010. 

The village has 3 streets.

Geography 
Stary Kainlyk is located 58 km southeast of Nikolo-Beryozovka (the district's administrative centre) by road. Yanguznarat is the nearest rural locality.

References 

Rural localities in Krasnokamsky District